Martin John Dale Bodenham (born 23 April 1950) is an English former football referee and cricket umpire who retired from the first-class cricket list in 2016. He was born in Brighton, but lived for part of his life in Looe, Cornwall. He now hails from Ferring, in Sussex.

In 2008, Bodenham was named by the England and Wales Cricket Board as a first-class umpire for the 2009 County cricket season. "He will make history as the first man to have officiated at top-flight football and umpire at first-class cricket in England and Wales." As a referee, his career highlights have included "the 1997 League Cup Final, and replay, between Leicester City and Middlesbrough."

Career
He first took up refereeing in Brighton 'parks' football in 1966.

His progression to top level refereeing was finally achieved in 1978.

In Europe, on 18 May 1994, he was fourth official at the 1994 European Cup Final in Athens, AC Milan defeating Barcelona 4–0.

His most prestigious appointment domestically was the League Cup Final at Wembley on 6 April 1997, when Leicester City drew 1–1 with Middlesbrough after extra time. A replay was necessary, during which Martin presided over Leicester's 1–0 victory at Hillsborough (also after extra time), the goal coming from Steve Claridge in the 100th minute.

He also refereed two FA Cup semi finals during his 32-year career, before his retirement in 1998. At this point, he entered the world of cricket, becoming a Sussex League umpire.

In 2001, he became the first ever Head of Refereeing for the county of Sussex. He is also a Premier League match observer, referees' assessor, and UEFA delegate.

Bodenham switched active sports completely in 2005, becoming a top-class cricket umpire, and was added to the ECB reserve list in 2006. He stood at the wicket for England A versus Sri Lanka at Worcester in May of that year.

See also
List of football referees

References

1950 births
Living people
Musicians from Brighton and Hove
People from Looe
English football referees
English cricket umpires
English Football League referees
Premier League referees